Amusement Today is a monthly periodical that features articles, news, pictures and reviews about all things relating to the amusement park industry, including parks, rides, and ride manufacturers. The trade newspaper, which is based in Arlington, Texas, United States, was founded in January 1997 by Gary Slade, Virgil E. Moore III and Rick Tidrow. In 1997, Amusement Today won the Impact Award in the services category for "Best New Product" from the International Association of Amusement Parks and Attractions (IAAPA). A year later, in 1998, the magazine founded the Golden Ticket Awards, for which it has become best known for throughout the amusement park industry. On January 2, 2001, Slade bought out his two partners, giving him sole ownership of the paper. The paper has two full-time and two part-time staff members at its Arlington office, along with two full-time writers and several freelance writers in various parts of the world.

Golden Ticket Awards

Every year, Amusement Today gives out awards to the best of the best in the amusement park industry in a ceremony known as the Golden Ticket Awards. The awards are handed out based on surveys given to experienced and well-traveled amusement park enthusiasts from around the world. The awards, which were first handed out in 1998, have been featured on the Discovery Channel and the Travel Channel.

2022 winners

Hosts: Six Flags Fiesta Texas and Morgan's Wonderland
The Amusement Today Golden Ticket Awards were announced on September 10, 2022.

2021 winners

Host: National Roller Coaster Museum and Archives
The Amusement Today Golden Ticket Awards were announced on September 9, 2021.

2020 winners

2019 winners

Host Park: Silverwood Theme Park
The Amusement Today Golden Ticket Awards were announced on September 9, 2019.

2018 winners

Host Park: Silver Dollar City
The Amusement Today Golden Ticket Awards were announced on September 8, 2018.

2017 winners

Host Park: Lake Compounce
The Amusement Today Golden Ticket Awards were announced on September 9, 2017.

2016 winners

Host Park: Cedar Point
The Amusement Today Golden Ticket Awards were announced on September 10, 2016.

2015 winners

Host Park: Coney Island
The Amusement Today Golden Ticket Awards were announced on September 12, 2015.

2014 winners

Host Park: SeaWorld San Diego
The Amusement Today Golden Ticket Awards were announced at a ceremony on September 5, 2014.

2013 winners

Host Park: Santa Cruz Beach Boardwalk
The Amusement Today Golden Ticket Awards were announced at a ceremony held September 7, 2013.

2012 winners

Host Park: Dollywood
The Amusement Today Golden Ticket Awards were announced at a ceremony held September 8, 2012.

2011 winners

2010 winners

2009 winners

2008 winners

2007 winners

2006 winners

2005 winners

2004 winners

2003 winners

2002 winners

2001 winners

2000 winners

1999 winners

1998 winners

Publisher's Picks

Host venues

 From 1998 to 2000, there was no Host Park; the awards were announced from Amusement Today Arlington, Texas, office instead.
 The 2020 event was canceled due to the COVID-19 pandemic that affected the amusement industry. Voting was not held in 2020 and regular categories were not awarded. Instead, a special category of industry leader awards was created along with publisher picks.

Former awards
 Best Carousel (2007-2018)
 Best Funhouse/Walk-Through (2008-2018)
 Best Indoor Roller Coaster (2007-2018)
  Best Seaside Park (2007-2018) - Santa Cruz Beach Boardwalk (2007-2014, 2016–2018), Morey's Piers (2015)
 Best Shows (1998-2018) - Busch Gardens Williamsburg (1998), Six Flags Fiesta Texas (1999-2008), Dollywood (2009-2018)
 The award for Best Shows was revamped after 2018, to just showcase a specific new show at a park.
 Cleanest Park (1998-2018) - Busch Gardens Williamsburg (1998-1999), Holiday World & Splashin' Safari (2000–2018)
 Friendliest Park (1998-2018) - Holiday World & Splashin' Safari (1998-2008, 2010–2011), Silver Dollar City (2009), Dollywood (2012–2018)

Repeat winners
 Best Amusement Park – Europa-Park for the last 7 years.
 Best Water Park – Schlitterbahn for all 24 years.
 Best Landscaping/Most Beautiful Park – Busch Gardens Williamsburg for 22 years
 Best Halloween Event – Universal Studios Orlando for 10 out of the 13 years the award has been given.
 Best Food – Knoebels for 18 out of last 19 years (tied once).
 Best Steel Roller Coaster – Fury 325 for the last 6 years.
 Best Shows – Dollywood for the last 10 years.
 Best Indoor Waterpark – Schlitterbahn Galveston Island for all 8 years the award has been given.
  Best Outdoor Production Show – IllumiNations: Reflections of Earth at Epcot for 12 out of the 13 years the award has been given.

References

External links
 Golden Ticket Awards

Amusement parks
Professional and trade magazines
Magazines established in 1997
Monthly magazines published in the United States
Magazines published in Texas
American awards